Wilhelm  Carl Gottlieb Müller (September 25, 1880 – June 16, 1968) was a German physicist, mathematician, and philosopher.  He is best known as the successor of Arnold Sommerfeld as Professor of Theoretical Physics at the University of Munich.

Life
Wilhelm Müller was born in Hamburg, the son of a merchant.

He studied at Leipzig University and earned his Rigorosum in mathematics, physics, and philosophy with the grade "very good". He went on to earn his PhD with Otto Hölder and Karl Rohn and a dissertation called "The rational curve of degree five in the five-, four-, three- and two-dimensional space" in 1911. At Leibniz University Hannover he got his habilitation and became a Privatdozent in 1921, and later was appointed associate professor. In 1928 he became a professor at the Charles University in Prague. He joined the Nazi Party in 1933, and went on to join the Sturmabteilung in 1936.
In 1934 he accepted a position as professor and director of the Aeronautical Institute at RWTH Aachen University.

His appointment in 1939 as Professor of Theoretical Physics at the University of Munich, a chair which had previously been held by Arnold Sommerfeld, but had been vacant for several years, was at the center of a controversy between modern physics and German physics.  Müller, an aerodynamicist, had not been thought of as a theoretical physicist before this time, and opposed the "new" theoretical physics promoted by scientists such as Albert Einstein. His appointment is seen by historians as political, and during his tenure he would teach only classical physics. He was dismissed in 1945 and barred from academia during allied denazification proceedings.

Works
 1911 - The rational curve of degree five in the five-, four, three- and two-dimensional space (Die rationale Kurve fünfter Ordnung im fünf-, vier-, drei- und zweidimensionalen Raum; dissertation, Universität Leipzig, Karl Rohn, Otto Hölder)
 1922 - The sense of chastity (Vom Sinn der Keuschheit)
 1925 - The Eternal Grail (Vom ewigen Gral)
 1925 - Dynamics (Dynamik) (1952)
 1928 - Mathematical Fluid Mechanics (Mathematische Strömungslehre)
 1932 - Introduction to the theory of viscous fluids (Einführung in die Theorie der zähen Flüssigkeiten)
 1933 - Jewry and Leadership (Judentum und Führertum)
 1936 - Introduction to Aerodynamics (Einführung in die Mechanik des Fluges) (1942, 1953, 1958)
 1936 - Jewry and Science (Judentum und Wissenschaft)
 1941 - Jewish and German Physics (Jüdische und Deutsche Physik), together with Johannes Stark
 1944 - The Battle in Physics (Kampf in der Physik)
 1959 - Theory of Elastic Deformation (Theorie der elastischen Verformung)

External links

References

Nazi Party members
Academic staff of the University of Hanover
Academic staff of Charles University
Academic staff of RWTH Aachen University
Academic staff of the Ludwig Maximilian University of Munich
1880 births
1968 deaths
20th-century German physicists
Leipzig University alumni